Shanmukh Jaswanth Kandregula is an Indian youtuber, television personality and actor. He is best known for his role as "Shannu" in the YouTube series The Software DevLOVEper and as "Surya" in Surya. As of February 2022, he has over 4.3 million subscribers on his YouTube channel. His other popular videos include The Viva, The Interview and Software Lo Inthe.

Early and personal life 
Shanmukh Jaswanth was born on 16 September 1994 in Visakhapatnam, Andhra Pradesh, India. He completed bachelor's degree in Business Administration from Gandhi Institute of Technology and Management, Visakhapatnam. Sabarish Kandregula, a Youtube web series director and one of the people behind the Youtube channel 'Viva' is Shanmukh's cousin.

Career

YouTube 
Shanmuk began his career by appearing in a dual role in the viral video The Viva, released in 2013. One of the role he played in the short video is "Shannu". Since then he is popularly referred to as Shannu. He started his own YouTube channel in 2012. In the initial days, he uploaded few dance covers, short films and comedy videos.

Shanmukh then featured in various other productions of Infinitum Media which include short films, dance covers and series. He kept consistently acting in videos for the channel 'Viva', especially as one of the two news readers on Viva News. His major breakthrough was the YouTube series The Software DevLOVEper directed by K. Subbu, in which he played the role "Shannu". The series made its debut on 31 July 2020 was released through his YouTube channel. Upon release, it got wide response from both critics and audience. Owing to success of the series, he then featured in few television shows. He then featured in another popular series Surya which made its debut on his channel on 16 February 2021. In September 2021, Sakshi Post called him as the "first Telugu Youtuber" to have four million subscribers.

Television 
Shanmukh first appeared in the game show Cash 2.0. He then participated in the reality television show Bigg Boss 5, and was runner-up of the season.

Filmography

Films

Television

Music videos

Videography

Awards and recognition 

 Shanmukh holds a total of two YouTube Creator Awards which include:- one Silver Play Button and one Golden Play Button
 2021: Best Performer Award 2020–Male (YouTube) at 10th Padmamohana TV Awards 2020
 2021: Star Artist Influencer of the Year by Digital Influencer Awards
 In 2021, he was signed as the Brand Ambassador of the Entri App

See also 

 List of YouTubers
 List of Indian Youtubers

References

External links 

 

Living people
1994 births
Indian YouTubers
Telugu male actors
Male actors from Visakhapatnam
People from Visakhapatnam district
People from Visakhapatnam
YouTube filmmakers
Comedy YouTubers
Music YouTubers
YouTube channels launched in 2012
Indian television personalities
Television personalities from Andhra Pradesh
Participants in Indian reality television series
Bigg Boss (Telugu TV series) contestants